Ludwig Norbert (born 19 November 1983) is a French former professional footballer who played as a midfielder. His brother, Guillaume, also played professional football.

Norbert started his career with English club Tottenham Hotspur, but after failing to settle he left the club in 2001 without having made a senior appearance. He joined Ligue 1 team FC Lorient, but again failed to break into the starting line-up and was loaned out to Scottish side Rangers in April 2002. A permanent move to US Créteil-Lusitanos followed in the summer of 2002 and he played five matches and scored one goal during his sole season with the club. Norbert signed for Angers SCO at the start of the 2003–04 season. He spent two years with Angers, making a total of 55 league appearances. Norbert later spent a season at LB Châteauroux, where he played one league game, before moving into amateur football with CEP Lorient.

References

1983 births
Living people
People from Châtenay-Malabry
French footballers
Association football midfielders
Tottenham Hotspur F.C. players
FC Lorient players
Rangers F.C. players
US Créteil-Lusitanos players
Angers SCO players
LB Châteauroux players
Ligue 2 players
Footballers from Hauts-de-Seine